is an anime adaption of the 1965 novel Belle et Sébastien by French author Cécile Aubry. The series ran on the Japanese network NHK from April 7, 1981–March 24, 1982. It consists of 52 episodes and was a co-production of MK Company,  Visual 80 Productions and Toho Company, Ltd. 

Toshiyuki Kashiwakura was the head writer and character designs were by Shuichi Seki. The show was broadcast on French and Japanese television in 1981, with American cable network Nickelodeon picking it up in 1984. In the United Kingdom, it aired on Children's BBC in 1989 and 1990.

This anime used many staffers from Nippon Animation's World Masterpiece Theater franchise, thus the look and feel is similar to that of a WMT production even though Nippon Animation itself was not involved with this series.

The series has been aired in many countries outside Japan and has been dubbed and subtitled in English and numerous other languages. The English-language script was written by Eileen Opatut, and the series was dubbed into English by Synchro-Quebec in Montreal.

Plot
The series is about the mountain-based adventures of a young boy named Sebastian and his Pyrenean mountain dog, Belle, who live in a small village in Southern France. He has no friends because he is bullied by the other children for not having a mother. But one day, he meets a gentle white dog who has been falsely accused of attacking people. He names her Belle and they become the best of friends. To save her from being put down, he leaves his adoptive family and flees to Spain with her and his little dog, Poochie. They have many adventures as they elude the police and search for his long-lost mother.

Characters
 Sebastian
 Sebastian is a 9-year-old boy from a French village near the mountains. Although his age is never explicitly given, the repeated references to 'the events 9 years ago' throughout the series point to it. His name was chosen because he was born on St. Sebastian's Day. Since he was born, he has been living with his adoptive grandfather, Cecil, and Anne-Marie who is Cecil's real granddaughter. He is good-natured and energetic, but the children in town tease him because he doesn't have a real mother. Sebastian's deepest desires are to find his mother and to have a good friend.

 Belle
 Belle ("Jolie" in the Japanese version) is a large white Great Pyrenees who escaped into the French countryside. She is gentle and warmhearted, but her attempts to help those in need are misunderstood. She is labeled "The White Monster" and the police are constantly on her tail.

 Poochie
 Poochie is a little puppy who rides around in Sebastian's pocket. Although Poochie is always yapping and getting into mischief, he is a good friend to Sebastian and Belle.

 Cecil
 Cecil took Sebastian in as a baby and acts as his adoptive grandfather. He is a loving mentor who teaches him all he knows about the mountains and the wilderness.

 Anne-Marie
 Anne-Marie is Cecil's biological granddaughter. She has helped care for Sebastian since he was born, and fancies herself as his mother despite being the age of an older sister at best. She loves him deeply, but is often overprotective and a little harsh.

 Paul
 Paul is Anne-Marie's older brother. He's a soldier in the mountain army.

 Isabel
 Isabel is Sebastian's real mother, a traveling Romani. She went against the gypsy code and married an outsider, but he died before Sebastian was born. She had him secretly in the mountains, and promised to come back for him one day when her people were able to understand.

 Sarah
 Sarah is a sick, lonely little girl living in Spain who Sebastian meets on his journey. Both long for friends their own age to play with, so they quickly become close. During the series she celebrates her 9th birthday. Her father is a very rich man who gives her everything she can possibly desire, yet the only thing that can make Sarah happy is to have a truly good friend. She reappears several times during his journey to lend a helping hand. Towards the end of the series Sarah is celebrating her 9th birthday, meaning that she is perhaps only a month older than Sebastian himself. During the course of the series, a romantic bond forms between Sebastian and Sarah, and it is strongly implied that the two of them married when they grew up and lived happily ever after, with Belle still at their side.

 Doctor Alexander Phillips (Original: Dr. Guillaume)
 Dr. Phillips is a local doctor in the village where Sebastian lives, he's also Anne-Marie's boyfriend.

 Mister Albert
 Mr. Albert is Sarah's father, a rich man, well respected in the community, and doesn't like dogs. He slowly becomes fond of Belle and Poochie after they help Sarah to get well with her sickness. His love for his daughter ensures his willingness to aid the fugitives, if only for her sake. He is in fact a long term fan and admirer of Isabel, admitting to her that he was the man who sent her red roses in Barcelona; it is implied that a romantic attachment meant is growing between the couple and that their respective children approve.

 Robert and Maria
 Robert and Maria are servants at the home of Mr. Albert.  Robert is the butler and sometimes chauffeur, while Maria is the housekeeper. They appear to be fond of each other but refuse to admit it, not even to themselves.

 The Carlos Company
 The Carlos Company is a band of gypsies whom Sebastian's mother, Isabel, is traveling with. Isabel is, in fact, their star performer because of her beauty and wonderful singing voice. She also makes and repairs the company's costumes, a skill she uses to good effect when she makes Anne-Marie a wedding dress.

 Hernandez and Fernandez
 Hernandez and Fernandez are a reoccurring duo of crooks that are trying to capture Belle for a quick rise to fame, fortune, and popularity.

 Oscar and Johnny
 Oscar is a traveling performer that uses his feats of strength by breaking chains wrapped around his body. Johnny is Oscar's son and also is a performer, but not in strength. His ability is that of balance and agility. They used to be members of the Carlos company and Oscar still holds a candle for Isabel in his heart, as well as a photo of her in his trunk, which he shows to Sebastian. He refuses to give it at first, as it is a prized possession.

 Inspector Garcia
 Inspector Garcia is an officer of the Spanish Police and is always hot on the trail of Belle and Sebastian. He is heavy-set and has a thin mustache. 

 Officer Martin
 Officer Martin is the Inspector's assistant and a very clumsy man.

 Commander Costello
 Costello is the head of the Spanish Border Guards and has a strong resemblance to Fidel Castro.

Episodes

References

External links
 
 
 

1981 anime television series debuts
1980s Nickelodeon original programming
NHK original programming
Television shows based on children's books
Television shows set in France
Adventure anime and manga
Historical anime and manga
Australian Broadcasting Corporation original programming
BBC children's television shows